Marco Marini (Brescia 1542–1594) was an Italian orientalist, and censor of Hebrew language publications for the Vatican. He prepared the first published edition of Targum Yerushalmi.

Works
 ms61 – a translation into Hebrew of the Gospels of Matthew and Mark from the convent of the Canons Regular of San Salvatore at Candiana, where Marini was a canon in 1568.
 The first edition of Targum Yerushalmi
 a Hebrew grammar entitled Gan Eden ('The Garden of Eden')

References

External links
 

Censors
1542 births
1594 deaths
Translators of the New Testament into Hebrew